Major General Parakrama Pannipitiya, RWP, RSP, USP is a former Sri Lankan army officer, who was the former Commander Security Forces Headquarters - East (SF HQ (E)). Under his command the Sri Lankan army units successfully concluded the Eastern Theater of operations in the Sri Lankan Civil War defeating the LTTE in the Eastern Province. 

Shortly after the military victory in the Eastern Theater, Major General Pannipitiya had a fallout with the then army commander Sarath Fonseka, who had him arrested on misappropriating military assets. A submission of a  violation of fundamental rights petitions and the following court martial cleared him of rough doing and he was appointed as Director of Operations 11th Division.           

Educated at Royal College, Colombo, he joined the army after leaving school and was commissioned into the Sri Lanka Sinha Regiment as a Second Lieutenant. He later graduated from staff college gaining the psc qualification. 

He was awarded the Rana Wickrama Padakkama (RWP),  Rana Sura Padakkama (RSP) for combat bravery and the service medals Uttama Seva Padakkama (USP), the Sri Lanka Armed Services Long Service Medal, the Riviresa Campaign Services Medal, the Purna Bhumi Padakkama and the North and East Operations Medal.

External links
On My Beat: A tale of two Generals' wailing wives..
Top military official takes on defence establishment

Sri Lankan major generals
Alumni of Royal College, Colombo
Sri Lanka Military Academy graduates
Sinhalese military personnel
Sinha Regiment officers